

273001–273100 

|-bgcolor=#f2f2f2
| colspan=4 align=center | 
|}

273101–273200 

|-bgcolor=#f2f2f2
| colspan=4 align=center | 
|}

273201–273300 

|-id=230
| 273230 de Bruyn ||  || John Roy de Bruyn (born 1958), a Canadian physicist working on experimental condensed-matter physics, with emphasis on soft materials, the physics of biological systems, and the dynamics of systems driven out of equilibrium || 
|-id=262
| 273262 Cottam ||  || Michael Gordon Cottam (born 1945), an English-Canadian physicist at the University of Western Ontario. He works in the field of condensed matter physics, with focus on surface physics, nanomaterials, and nonlinear processes in solids, and includes magnetic, optical, and electronic properties of these materials (Src). || 
|-id=273
| 273273 Piwowarski ||  || Marcin Piwowarski (1984–2007), a computer consultant, specializing in flight simulators || 
|}

273301–273400 

|-bgcolor=#f2f2f2
| colspan=4 align=center | 
|}

273401–273500 

|-id=412
| 273412 Eduardomissoni ||  || Eduardo Missoni (born 1954) is an Italian physician specializing in tropical medicine. He is a professor at Bocconi University Management School in Milan, and worked for the Italian government in the cooperation management and health programs in Latin America and sub-Saharan Africa. || 
|}

273501–273600 

|-bgcolor=#f2f2f2
| colspan=4 align=center | 
|}

273601–273700 

|-bgcolor=#f2f2f2
| colspan=4 align=center | 
|}

273701–273800 

|-bgcolor=#f2f2f2
| colspan=4 align=center | 
|}

273801–273900 

|-id=836
| 273836 Hoijyusek ||  || Hoi Jyu Sek (Haizhushi), "the Rock of the Pearl in Sea", was a large rock in the Pearl River that had been treated as an icon of Guangzhou (Canton) for many centuries. || 
|}

273901–274000 

|-id=936
| 273936 Tangjingchuan ||  || Tang Shunzhi (1507–1560), also known as Tang Jingchuan, was a famous Chinese writer, poet and statesman in the Ming dynasty. A native of Changzhou, Tang's argument for the "concrete studies" (shixue) made him an important figure in the Changzhou intellectual framework. || 
|-id=987
| 273987 Greggwade ||  || Gregg Wade (born 1971), a Canadian astrophysicist at the Royal Military College of Canada whose research includes the structure, evolution, origin and impact of magnetic fields in larger stars (Src). || 
|-id=994
| 273994 Cinqueterre ||  || The Italian region of Cinque Terre ("Five Villages") in Liguria. The coastline and the surrounding hillsides are all part of the Cinque Terre National Park, which is a UNESCO World Heritage Site. || 
|}

References 

273001-274000